Sekhala tehsil is a tehsil in Jodhpur District of Rajasthan state in western India. Headquarters for the tehsil is the village of Sekhala. 

It borders Balesar tehsil to the east and Shergarh tehsil to the west.

Villages
There are twenty-eight panchayat villages in Sekhala tehsil.
 Sekhala
 Gilakor
 Godelai
 Lorta Achalawata
 Natharau
 Prahaladpura
 Kanodiya Purohitan
 Ketu Kallan
 Ketu MadA
 Chamu
 Dera
 Deriya
 Dewatoo
 Bhaloo Anoopgarh
 Bhaloo Rajwa
 Barnau

References

Tehsils of Rajasthan